Kim Jung-Kyum  (born 9 June 1976) is a South Korean retired football midfielder.

He represented the national team in 7 matches and also formerly played for Chunnam Dragons, Jeonbuk Hyundai Motors and Pohang Steelers in the South Korean K-League.

Club career 
Kim Jung-kyum joined to Chunnam Dragons in 1999, after has contributed to the 2003 Korean FA Cup runner-up. In 2005, Jeonbuk Hyundai Motors agreed a player swap with Park Jae-hong going in the opposite direction, after has contributed to the win for 2005 Korean FA Cup and 2006 AFC Champions League. In 2008, he moved to Pohang Steelers. On 2 June 2011, his club Pohang terminated the contract with him for betting on League Cup match after receiving a tip-off from an opposition player involved in the match-fixing.

International career 
Between 2003 and 2004, Kim Jung-Kyum won a total of 7 international caps for the South Korea national team.
He made his South Korea national team debut on 25 September 2003 in a A-match against Vietnam at the 2004 AFC Asian Cup qualification, who played for 2004 AFC Asian Cup.

Club career statistics

Honours

Individual
Tongyeong Cup MVP: 2004

Club
Chunnam Dragons
Asian Cup Winners Cup Runners-up: 1999
K-League Cup Runners-up: 2000
Korean FA Cup Runners-up: 2003

Jeonbuk Hyundai Motors
Korean FA Cup Champions: 2005
Korean Super Cup Runners-up: 2006
AFC Champions League Champions: 2006

Pohang Steelers
Korean FA Cup Champions: 2008

References

External links
 
 National Team Player Record 
 

1976 births
Living people
Association football midfielders
South Korean footballers
South Korea international footballers
2004 AFC Asian Cup players
Jeonnam Dragons players
Jeonbuk Hyundai Motors players
Pohang Steelers players
K League 1 players
F.C. Meralco Manila players
Expatriate footballers in the Philippines